Enrique Ramil (born 18 June 1984 in Ares, La Coruña) is a Spanish singer, musician, songwriter and vocal coach.

He took part as contestant on different Spanish TV shows such as  Operación Triunfo, The X Factor and won the second series of Tierra de Talento (2020).

The singer is internationally well-known because of the quality of his voice and performance. He has released four studio albums: V. O. (2008), Juguetes Rotos (2011), Thank you (2015) and  Ramil y una noches (2019), and more than twenty singles. He has performed in Spain, Latin America and United States.

Career 
Enrique Ramil was born on 18 June 1984 in Ares La Coruña, Spain. When he was three he joined the parish choir of his home town in Galicia.

At the age of nineteen he moved to Madrid where he attended singing and musical theatre lessons. His professional career started in 2005 and since then he has performed in lots of different stages such as streets of London, television, theatres...

Between 2006 and 2007 he becomes co-protagonist of the musical PaquitaDora  in the role of Coco Mandala

2008:  V. O. 
During that year his first album V. O. ("versión original" in Spanish) was released by Enrique Ramil as an independent artist. Produced by Edu and Sergio Del Val, the album includes special versions of meaningful songs for the artist. The singles released were Remolino, a cover of the famous song by Cuban singer Francisco Céspedes, Creo en mí, adaptation to Spanish of Believe by Yolanda Adams and El loco version of Il pazzo by Mina.

2009–2010: Battle of the Choirs and other projects 
In 2009 Enrique joined the TV show La batalla de los coros on Cuatro, (the Spanish version of the Australian show the Battle of the Choirs). He was part of the choir coordinated by the Spanish singer Marta Sánchez

During that year his song Es mi voluntad becomes part of the Spanish pre-selection for the Eurovision Song Contest 2010 The song reached number 28 among more than three hundred songs.

In 2010 he participated on the talent show Tu sí que vales, on Telecinco television channel.

2011–2012: Operación Triunfo (Spanish TV series) and Juguetes Rotos 
Enrique took part in the castings for the eight season of the Spanish talent show OT 2011. He became one of the 16 contestants in the famous TV Academy. This show and the OT tour granted Enrique Ramil some recognition in Spain. That year he released his second musical project Juguetes Rotos featuring duets with Maria do Ceo, Ainhoa Cantalapiedra and Rosa Cedrón.

In 2012 he released Believe in LOVE, Pride Barcelona 2012 anthem. He also funded Mandala Gospel choir in Ares, his home town, that he directs till 2015. He also started working as vocal coach.

Between 2012 and 2013 he became a regular guest on the Galician TV show Heicho Cantar on TVG, featuring Mandala Gospel choir in one of the shows.

2012-2018: London, The X Factor and Ramil y una noches 
In 2015 he moved to London where he lived for two years. During his time in the capital city he became a street performer (busking). He joined the castings for the new seasons of The X Factor UK, reaching the famous six chairs challenge.

Back in Spain, in 2017 he performed with the Black Light Gospel Choir in La Voz and La Voz Kids on Telecinco. But he decided to join the castings for Factor X (Spanish TV series). He was chosen and he went to the live shows on television, reaching the finals.

2019: Volcanes  
After his time on The X Factor he went on the Ramil y una noches tour, singing versions of classic songs that he would release on a new musical project: Ramil y una noches.

He also launched a crowdfunding campaign to release Volcanes, his new original song and videoclip.

During 2019 he released several singles from Ramil y una noches, including covers of songs such as Perdóname written by Beatriz Luengo and originally sang by Ricky Martin, or 18 años an original song by Dalida firstly performed in Spanish by Luz Casal.

2020: Tierra de Talento and the American Adventure 
In 2020 Enrique Ramil became a contestant on the Canal Sur Televisión show Tierra de Talento. Judges such as India Martínez, José Mercé, Diana Navarro, Lola Índigo, Carlos Álvarez and Jesús Reina showed great admiration for his performances. He sang covers of songs originally performed by India Martínez, Vanesa Martín, Rocío Jurado or a medley from the Aladdin original soundtracks (on the role of the Genie).

On 25 July he became winner of that season after singing Alejandro Sanz's Mi soledad y yo

During September that same year international media announced that the artist would be flying to the US to record his new album. He would be collaborating with SanLuis, writers of songs for Marc Anthony, Prince Royce, among others.

He has also recorded duets in Spain with Diana Navarro, India Martínez and María Villalón produced by Alejandro Romero.

In October he releases the single "Soy lo prohibido", originally performed by Olga Guillot, but also other artists such as Natalia Lafourcade or Luis Miguel.

During his time in Miami, Enrique collaborates with Latin Grammy artist writing song for his new project. The  Spanish Consulate in New York invited him to a showcase in 'Roommate Times Square'. He also performed the best of his repertoire in another showcase in Miami.

Back in Spain, the artist takes part in a homage to Manuel Alejandro, musician and writer of very famous Latin songs. National press highlighted his performance.

A the beginning of December, the singer releases "A tu vera", song written by Rafael de León and Juan Solano, originally performed by Spanish Lola Flores. This release was a present to his fans just before the release of the new song.

2021: United States and Latin America - Mentira, Prefiero ser la otra and more 
On 22 January the singer will release his new song and videoclip, recorded and filmed in Miami.

Canal Sur television invites Enrique Ramil to the New Year's special Tierra 2021. The artist sang in Galizian a duet with María Villalón. The chosen song was Lela, previously performed by Dulce Pontes .

On the 29 of January Enrique Ramil released  Mentira, the first single in latinamerica. The song and videoclip were recorded in Miami and produced by the prestigious duet San Luis. Tierra de Talento (Spain) was the first stage for the first performance of the song. Promotion of the song continued in Panamá, Guatemala and United States.

In March, Enrique Ramil was performed Mentira and was interviewed on  "Hoy día", a tv show of Telemundo, where he also received a message from his admired Olga Tañón.

His new single, Prefiero ser la otra was released on April 2 that year. being popular in Latin America. Its videoclip was directed by Alexander Escorcia, same director of his previous videoclip "Mentira". The song was considered on the "most risky singles", because the singer performed it on the original gender it was written for: female. Esta canción fue presentada en el programa matutino estadounidense Despierta América. TV shows in USA and Latin America (Mega TV and Telemundo), prove the internacional interest for his music.

A ranchera version of Prefiero ser la otra was released featuring the Venezuelan singer Karina. Enrique Ramil homages Mexico with this version.

El artista sigue produciendo nuevos proyectos en Miami que irán conformando su siguiente disco.

On the 11 of June Qué trabajo me da is released. The singer describes this song as a mixture of Craig David and Juan Luis Guerra styles.

At the end of the year he performed in Osuna and Madrid. Then he started a tour on Latin America on voice and piano format. He visits Panamá, Bogotá, Santiago de Chile, México and Caracas. As a pre-tour promotion two live videoclips were released, directed by David León:  El triste and original of Roberto Cantoral famously sang by José José andFarsante, written by Amaro Ferreiro, Iván Ferreiro and Miguel Conejo Torres.

 Discography 

 Albums 

 EP 

 Singles 

 Collaborations 

 Soundtracks 
 Believe in Love (Tercera Planta), Pride Barcelona 2012 official anthem.

 Videoclips 

 Soundtracks 
 Believe in Love (Tercera Planta), Pride Barcelona 2012'' official anthem.

Videoclips

Tours 
 2007–2009: Cocó Mandala y Jazz Kidding
 2009–2010: Enrique Ramil Quartet (Galicia)
 2011: Gira OT 2011 (Spain)
 2017–2020: Ramil y una noches (Spain)
 2021: 2021 Tour (Spain, Panamá, Bogotá, Santiago de Chile, Mexico y Caracas)

Musicals 
 PaquitaDora – as Coco Mandala, co-protagonist – Spain, 2006 and 2007

Television

Awards and nominations

References

External links 
 
 
 
 
 

Living people
1984 births
Spanish male singers
Spanish musicians
Spanish composers